Carmi-White County High School is a public high school in Carmi, Illinois, United States.

Athletics
Carmi-White County High School plays in the Black Diamond Conference.

State Championships
 Boys Golf (Class A)
 Team
1975-76
1976-77
1977-78
1978-79
1979-80
Individual
1976-77 John Given
1978-79 John Given
1979-80 Keith Bratton
2001-02 Kyle Hosick

Notable alumni
 Josh Elder - comic book creator (Mail Order Ninja, StarCraft: Frontline)
 Frederick J. Karch - U.S. Marine Corps Brigadier General (World War II, Vietnam)
 Glenn Poshard - Illinois State Senator (1984–1988), U.S. Representative (1989–1999), Illinois Gubernatorial Candidate (1998), President of Southern Illinois University (2006–Present)

Clubs and Extracurricular Activities
Band
Thespian/Drama Club
Student Council/Class Officef
Math Team
Science Club
National Honor Society
Fellowship of Christian Athletes
Girls' Athletic Club
Art Club

Band
Carmi-White County High School Band participates in several activities and plays at all the Varsity Home games for Football and Basketball. 
Marching Band
Pep Band
Concert Band
Jazz Band

References

Public high schools in Illinois
Schools in White County, Illinois